Pipiolo may refer to:
Pipiolos the name under which early 19th century Chilean liberals were known under 
The Puerto Rican Independence Party